There are about a hundred Anglican churches in the city of Toronto, Ontario, Canada. Toronto is in the Anglican Diocese of Toronto, which includes the city of Toronto and much of south central Ontario. The eastern part of Toronto is part of the York-Scarborough episcopal area while the western half of the city is in the York-Credit Valley, which also includes Mississaga and Peel. The city is further divided into nine deaneries.

See also

List of Anglican churches
List of Anglican cathedrals in Canada
List of Orthodox churches in Toronto
List of Presbyterian churches in Toronto
List of Catholic churches in Toronto
List of Synagogues in Toronto
List of United Church of Canada churches in Toronto

References
Anglican Churches in Toronto

 
Churches, Anglican
Toronto, Anglican